Engalaguppe Seetharamiah Venkataramiah (18 December 1924 – 24 September 1997) was the 19th Chief Justice of India, serving from 19 June 1989 until his retirement on 17 December 1989.

He began his legal career in 1946, and was appointed as a Judge of Karnataka High Court in November 1970.

In March 1979, he was appointed as Judge of the Supreme Court of India, and he became Chief Justice of India in June 1989. Incidentally he is the first person from Karnataka to become the Chief Justice of India. He died of a heart attack on 24 September 1997.

References

External links
 Brief biography at http://supremecourtofindia.nic.in/

Chief justices of India
1924 births
1997 deaths
Judges of the Karnataka High Court
20th-century Indian judges
20th-century Indian lawyers
Karnataka politicians